Jean-Hubert Gailliot (born 1961) is a French writer and publisher. Along Sylvie Martigny, he was one of the cofounder of the éditions Tristram in 1989.

Works 
1997: La Vie magnétique, Paris, Éditions de l'Olivier, 125 p. 
2000: Les Contrebandiers, Éditions de l’Olivier, 189 p. 
2004: L’Hacienda, Éditions de l’Olivier, 318 p. 
2004: 30 minutes à Harlem, Éditions de l’Olivier, series "Petite bibliothèque de l’Olivier", 58 p. 
2006: Bambi Frankenstein, Éditions de l’Olivier, 121 p. 
2014: Le Soleil, Éditions de l’Olivier, 529 p.  - Prix Wepler 2014

References

External links 
 Jean-Hubert Gailliot on France Culture
 Jean-Hubert Gailliot - Le soleil on YouTube
 Le désir de littérature ne peut disparaître, Jean-Hubert Gailliot on ActuaLitté
 Jean-Hubert Gailliot on Babelio
 Sylvie Martigny et Jean-Hubert Gailliot à Auch on Le Monde (1 March 2012)
 Le prix Wepler attribué à Jean-Hubert Gailliot pour "Le Soleil" on ''Le Point (10 November 2014)

21st-century French non-fiction writers
21st-century novelists
French publishers (people)
1961 births
Living people